The Soviet Union (USSR) competed at the 1984 Winter Olympics in Sarajevo, Yugoslavia.

Medalists

Alpine skiing

Men

Women

Biathlon

Men

Men's 4 x 7.5 km relay

Bobsleigh

Cross-country skiing

Men

Men's 4 × 10 km relay

Women

Women's 4 × 5 km relay

Figure skating

Men

Women

Pairs

Ice Dancing

Ice hockey

First round
Top two teams (shaded ones) advanced to the medal round.

USSR 12-1 Poland
USSR 5-1 Italy
USSR 9-1 Yugoslavia
USSR 6-1 West Germany
USSR 10-1 Sweden

Medal round

USSR 4-0 Canada
USSR 2-0 Czechoslovakia

Carried over group match:
USSR 10-1 Sweden

Luge

Men

(Men's) Doubles

Women

Nordic combined 

Events:
 normal hill ski jumping 
 15 km cross-country skiing

Ski jumping

Speed skating

Men

Women

References
Official Olympic Reports
International Olympic Committee results database
 Olympic Winter Games 1984, full results by sports-reference.com

Nations at the 1984 Winter Olympics
1984
Winter Olympics